Jerk is a style of cooking native to Jamaica, in which meat is dry-rubbed or wet marinated with a hot spice mixture called Jamaican jerk spice.

The art of jerking (or cooking with jerk spice) originated with Amerindians in Jamaica from the Arawak and Taíno tribes who intermingled with the Maroons.

The smoky taste of jerked meat is achieved using various cooking methods, including modern wood-burning ovens. The meat is normally chicken or pork, and the main ingredients of the spicy jerk marinade sauce are allspice and Scotch bonnet peppers. Jerk cooking is popular in Caribbean and West Indian diaspora communities throughout North America and Western Europe.

Etymology 
The word jerk is said to come from charqui, a Spanish term of Quechua origin for jerked or dried meat, which eventually became the word jerky in English.

The term jerk spice (also commonly known as Jamaican jerk spice) refers to a spice rub. The word jerk refers to the spice rub, wet marinade, and to the particular cooking technique. Jerk cooking has developed a global following, most notably in American, Canadian and Western European cosmopolitan urban centres.

History 
Historians have evidence that jerked meat was first cooked by the indigenous Taíno. During the invasion of Jamaica in 1655, the Spanish colonists freed their enslaved Africans who fled into the Jamaican countryside, intermingling with the remaining Taínos and becoming some of the first Jamaican Maroons. It appears that these runaway slaves learned this practice from the Taíno. The technique of cooking in underground pits is believed to have been used in order to avoid creating smoke which would have given away their location. It is speculated that the Taíno developed the style of cooking and seasoning. While all racial groups hunted the wild hog in the Jamaican interior, and used the practice of jerk to cook it in the seventeenth century, by the end of the eighteenth century most groups had switched to imported pork products. Only the Maroons continued the practice of hunting wild hogs and jerking the pork.

Jamaican jerk sauce primarily developed from these Maroons, seasoning and slow cooking wild hogs over pimento wood, which was native to Jamaica at the time and is the most important ingredient in the taste; over the centuries it has been modified as various cultures added their influence. 

From the start, the Maroons found themselves in new surroundings on the interior of Jamaica and were forced to use what was available to them. As a result, they adapted to their surroundings and used herbs and spices available to them on the island such as Scotch bonnet pepper, which is largely responsible for the heat found in Caribbean jerks.

Jerk cooking and seasoning has followed the Caribbean diaspora all over the world, and forms of jerk can now be found at restaurants almost anywhere a significant population of Caribbean descent exists, such as the United Kingdom, Canada, or the United States. Poulet boucané (or 'smoked chicken'), a dish found in French Caribbean countries such as Martinique and Guadeloupe, is quite similar to traditional Jamaican jerk chicken.

Techniques 

The cooking technique of jerking, as well as the results it produces, has evolved over time from using pit fires to old oil barrel halves as the containing vessel of choice. Around the 1960s, Caribbean entrepreneurs seeking to recreate the smoked pit flavor by an easier, more portable method came up with a solution to cut oil barrels lengthwise and attach hinges, drilling several ventilation holes for the smoke. These barrels are fired with charcoal, which enhances the spicy, smoky taste. Alternatively, when these cooking methods are unavailable, other methods of meat smoking, including wood-burning ovens, can be used to jerk meat. However, oil barrels are arguably one of the most popular cooking methods for making jerk in Jamaica. Most jerk in Jamaica is no longer cooked in the traditional method and is grilled over hardwood charcoal in a steel drum "jerk pan".

Street-side "jerk stands" or "jerk centres" are frequently found in Jamaica and the nearby Cayman Islands, as well as throughout the Caribbean diaspora and beyond. Jerked meat, usually chicken or pork, can be purchased along with hard dough bread, deep fried cassava bammy (flatbread, usually with fish), Jamaican fried dumplings (known as "Johnnycake" or "journey cakes"), and festival, a variation of sweet flavored fried dumplings made with sugar and served as a side.

Ingredients 
Jerk seasoning principally consists of allspice and Scotch bonnet peppers. Other ingredients may include cloves, cinnamon, scallions, nutmeg, thyme, garlic, brown sugar, ginger, soy sauce, and salt.

Uses 
Jerk seasoning was originally used on chicken and pork, but in modern recipes it is used with other ingredients including fish, shrimp, shellfish, beef, sausage, lamb, goat, tofu, and vegetables.

See also 

 List of Jamaican dishes
 List of chicken dishes

Notes

References

Further reading 
 Cook, Ian and Harrison, Michelle. "Cross over Food: Re-Materializing Postcolonial Geographies". Transactions of the Institute of British Geographers, New Series, Vol. 28, No. 3 (September 2003), pp. 296–317. Blackwell Publishing on behalf of The Royal Geographical Society (with the Institute of British Geographers)

External links 

Barbecue
Spices
Caribbean cuisine
Jerk spice
Jerk chicken
National dishes
Caribbean meat dishes